A New Americans Club is a type of benefit society established by Holocaust survivors in the United States. These postwar establishments were largely created by refugees settling in newer Jewish communities, unlike in older urban centers like New York City where survivors largely joined a previous generation's landsmanshaftn.

References

Aftermath of the Holocaust
Mutual organizations
Jewish community organizations
Jewish clubs and societies
Refugees in the United States